The Morris CS9/Light Armoured Car was a British armoured car used by the British Army in the Second World War.

History
The vehicle was based on a Morris Commercial C9 4x2  truck chassis. On this chassis, a riveted hull was mounted with an open-topped two-man turret. The armament consisted of either Boys anti-tank rifle and Bren light machine gun or Vickers machine gun. The vehicle carried a No. 19 radio set.

The prototype was tested in 1936. A further 99 cars were ordered and were delivered in 1938. Thirty-eight of these cars were used by the 12th Royal Lancers in the Battle of France, where all of them were destroyed or abandoned. Another 30 served with the 11th Hussars in the North African Campaign. It was found that, when fitted with desert tyres, the vehicle had good performance on soft sand. However, its armour and armament were insufficient. The vehicle was retired halfway through the North African Campaign.

References

Forty, George - World War Two Armoured Fighting Vehicles and Self-Propelled Artillery, Osprey Publishing 1996 
wwiivehicles.com: Morris CS9 scout car

CS9
World War II armoured fighting vehicles of the United Kingdom
Armoured cars of the United Kingdom
Armoured cars of the interwar period
Military vehicles introduced in the 1930s
Vehicles introduced in 1938
SPGs. SPAs. Armored cars and trucks of 1938